Events in the year 2013 in Chad.

Incumbents 

 President: Idriss Déby
 Prime Minister: Emmanuel Nadingar (until January 21), Djimrangar Dadnadji (from January 21st onwards)

Events

January 

 January 21 – The Health Minister of Chad announces that 38 children have been hospitalized after getting vaccinated against Meningitis.

March 

 March 2 – The Chadian army claims to have killed Mokhtar Belmokhtar, responsible for a terrorist enacted hostage situation in Algeria. The claims would go on to be disproven.
 March 14 – Poachers in Ganba, in Southern Chad, slaughter 89 elephants.

April 

 April 15 – President Déby announces that Chad will be pulling troops out of Mali.

May 

 May 2 – 4 People are killed in N'Djamena due to a plot conspiracy to destabilize the government, which was labelled a coup.

June 

 June 14 – The UNHRC relocates 7,000 refugees to escape emerging brutal conditions of the wet season.
June 26 – Chad catches poachers responsible for the poaching of 89 elephants earlier in March.

July 

 July 2 – Former president Hissène Habré is charged with crimes against humanity, war crimes, and torture by Senegal.
 July 26 – The Global Fund grants Chad over $28 million to help secure access to mosquito nets in the country to combat Malaria.

October 

 October 31 – The government of Chad signs an agreement to end the use of child soldiers by the army and security forces of the country.

November 

 November 25 – The head of UNAMID meets President Déby to promote processes towards peace in Darfur.

December 

 Human Rights Watch releases a report depicting the atrocities of the Chadian government under the administration of former president Hissène Habré.

References 

 
Years of the 21st century in Chad
2010s in Chad
Chad
Chad